Mario Župetić (born March 4, 1983) is a Croatian former footballer.

Playing career 
Župetić played abroad in 2003 with Hamilton Thunder in the Canadian Professional Soccer League. Shortly after he was traded to Toronto Croatia, where he assisted in securing a postseason berth. He featured in the CPSL Championship quarterfinal match against Brampton Hitmen. In 2004, he signed with DSV Leoben in the Austrian Football First League. He made his debut on April 15, 2005 against SV Wörgl. In 2006, he played in the First County Football League with NK Radnik Velika Gorica.

References

External links
 

1983 births
Living people
Association football forwards
Croatian footballers
Hamilton Thunder players
Toronto Croatia players
DSV Leoben players
RNK Split players
Canadian Soccer League (1998–present) players
2. Liga (Austria) players
Croatian expatriate footballers
Expatriate soccer players in Canada
Croatian expatriate sportspeople in Canada
Expatriate footballers in Austria
Croatian expatriate sportspeople in Austria